Anthony Vázquez (born July 29, 1988) is an American-born Puerto Rican footballer.

External links
 Monmouth University bio
 

1988 births
Living people
American soccer players
Puerto Rican footballers
Puerto Rico international footballers
St. John's Red Storm men's soccer players
Monmouth Hawks men's soccer players
Puerto Rico Islanders players
Pittsburgh Riverhounds SC players
Soccer players from New York (state)
North American Soccer League players
USL Championship players
Association football defenders